Apapelgino (Chukchi: , Apapèḷ'gyn) is a rural locality (a selo) in Chaunsky District of Chukotka Autonomous Okrug, Russia, located just to the east of Pevek, on the northeastern shores of Chaunskaya Bay. As of June 2005, its population was estimated to be five people.

Constructed as a part of the expansion of the Pevek Airport, Apapelgino has been mostly abandoned, although not officially abolished.

Etymology
There are several versions of the origin of Apapelgino's name. The first theory is that it comes from the Chukchi word "" (apaapaḷgyn), meaning spider's neck, due to a variety of spiders in this place. Another theory is that it is a portmanteau of the Yupik word "" (apy), meaning snow, and the Chukchi word "" (velgyn), meaning throat or mouth. Finally, the name could have derived from the Koryak word "" (apiapil), meaning a sacrificial place.

History
Apapelgino was used primarily to meet the administrative needs of the Pevek Airport, as well as for housing the airport's workers. In the 1950s, the airfield was developed as a part of the Soviet Air Forces' plan to create a ring of air bases around the Arctic for the use of its strategic bomber fleet during the Cold War. During the Cold War, this airfield formed a network of forward staging bases inside the Arctic Circle, the need for which was dictated by geography and weather. The northern parts of the Soviet Union closest to the United States are in the Arctic, with hostile weather conditions. Consequently, Soviet strategic bombers were normally stationed at bases in more temperate parts of the Soviet Union, flying training missions from these forward staging bases. However, the focus on intercontinental ballistic missiles as opposed to bombers meant that the airfield became less important and this was reflected by a gradual reduction in the local population.

Following the 1957 expansion of the airport, construction of a road linking Apapelgino to Pevek began in 1959; in 1961, a bridge was constructed over the Apapelgyn River to complete the link. As Apapelgino grew, a boiler house, greenhouses for growing vegetables, a complex for the lower secondary school, cafeteria and library, a nursery, kindergarten, and a series of apartment buildings were built.

By the beginning of the 21st century, however, the reduction in the population was such that it was decided that the remaining residents would be resettled to Pevek, with most residents leaving in 2001. Nevertheless, some refused to be resettled and, for the fear of losing the privileges allotted to the residents of localities in the process of liquidation, continued to reside in Apapelgino even after central heating was turned off. Most of those residents moved out in 2002.

Even after Apapelgino was mostly abandoned (with only five people remaining in residence as of 2005), the airport still serves as the main transport hub for Northern Chukotka and the local infrastructure is being maintained.

Administrative and municipal status
Within the framework of administrative divisions, Apapelgino is subordinated to Chaunsky District. Within the framework of municipal divisions, Apapelgino is a part of Pevek Urban Settlement within Chaunsky Municipal District.

Transportation

Apapelgino is served by the Pevek Airport. The only road connecting Apapelgino with outside world leads to Pevek.

Climate
Apapelgino has a Tundra climate (ET) according to the Köppen climate classification.

Gallery

See also
List of inhabited localities in Chaunsky District

References

Notes

Sources
Bema Gold Corporation. Environmental Impact Assessment, Kupol Gold Project, Far East Russia, June 2005.
 
 
 
В. В. Леонтьев и К. А. Новикова (V. V. Leontyev and K. A. Novikova). "Топонимический словарь северо-востока СССР (Toponymic Dictionary of the Northeastern USSR''). Magadan, 1989.

External links
Apapelgino photo gallery
Panoramas of Apapelgino
More photos of Apapelgino

Rural localities in Chukotka Autonomous Okrug
Populated places of Arctic Russia